Music Express (abbreviated ME on later covers) is a Canadian music magazine. Published as a print magazine from 1976 to 1996, it ceased operations that year but has since been relaunched as an online magazine.

History and profile
Founded in 1976 as Alberta Music Express by Keith Sharp, it was renamed Music Express in 1978 for most of its run, also becoming Rock Express for the duration of 1986 to 1988. Initially published in a tabloid format, it adopted the magazine format in 1982. Music Express primarily covered rock and pop music, with a focus on Canadian music; during the 1980s, its distribution expanded to the United States, with a corresponding U.S. edition produced. It was distributed via exclusive deals with various record store chains, including Kelly's Records in Western Canada and A&A Records in Eastern Canada.

Losing its distribution companies in the 1990s, the magazine was renamed Impact in 1993, finally ending in 1996. Meanwhile, Sharp founded the music and lifestyle magazine ACCESS in 1994, which continues today.

In 2012, Sharp relaunched Music Express in its current online magazine format. Sharp published Music Express: The Rise, Fall & Resurrection of Canada's Music Magazine, a book about the magazine's history, with Dundurn Press in April 2014. The book also featured a foreword by Alan Frew, the lead singer of Canadian rock band Glass Tiger.

References

Music magazines published in Canada
Canadian music websites
Monthly magazines published in Canada
Online magazines published in Canada
Defunct magazines published in Canada
Magazines established in 1976
Magazines disestablished in 1996
Magazines published in Alberta
Online music magazines published in Canada
Online magazines with defunct print editions